Nikola Nikić (born 7 January 1956) is a Bosnian former footballer and current manager of NK Bratstvo Gračanica in the First League of FBiH.

Playing career
Nikić, born to father Ilija and mother Radojka (née Tadić), started his career in the lower leagues with FK Modriča and NK Zvijezda Gradačac before joining FK Željezničar Sarajevo. Although he was an excellent winger, he became famous for his funny character and truthful nature. Maybe he is not one of the all-time best FK Željezničar players, but surely one of the most popular ones. He is often a guest on various TV and radio shows because of his stories about himself being silly in all kind of strange situations.

His biggest playing success was being the member of the famous FK Željezničar squad which under the guidance of Ivica Osim reached UEFA Cup semifinals in the 1984–85 season. But Nikić didn't play the semifinal match against Videoton because in December 1984 he moved to Greece where he stayed for four seasons. In the 1984–85 season, he played for Egaleo F.C. making 19 appearances scoring 3 goals. During 1985–86 and 1986–87 seasons he played for Aris Thessaloniki F.C. and scored 12 goals in 53 league matches. At the end of the 1986–87 season he moved to Aris' fierce rival PAOK and played only 9 league matches in season 1987–88 without scoring any goals. After that season, he came back to FK Željezničar in 1988 where he stayed until the middle of the 1990–91 season when he moved to NK Čelik Zenica. He stayed at Čelik until 1992 when he moved to FK Borac Banja Luka. In 1993 he ended his playing career after leaving Borac.

Managerial career
After he ended his career as a professional footballer, he became a coach. He was the manager of FK Modriča, FK Kolubara Lazarevac, NK Žepče, Thermaikos FC, NK TOŠK Tešanj and FK Borac Šamac.

Since June 2018, Nikolić has been the head coach of First League FBiH club NK Bratstvo Gračanica.

His biggest success was when he led FK Modriča to a place in the 2003–04 Premier League of Bosnia and Herzegovina after he won with Modriča the 2002–03 First League of the Republika Srpska.

He was also the head coach of the Bosnia-Herzegovina U19 team and the Bosnia-Herzegovina U21 team.

He was for a moment the head coach of the Republika Srpska official team (league selection) in September 2013.

Personal life
His son Branislav is also a professional player in Greece.

Honours

Manager
Modriča
First League of RS: 2002–03

References

External links
Nikola Nikić at Sofascore

1956 births
Living people
People from Modriča
Serbs of Bosnia and Herzegovina
Association football wingers
Yugoslav footballers
FK Modriča players
NK Zvijezda Gradačac players
FK Željezničar Sarajevo players
Egaleo F.C. players
Aris Thessaloniki F.C. players
PAOK FC players
NK Čelik Zenica players
FK Borac Banja Luka players
Yugoslav First League players
Super League Greece players
Yugoslav expatriate footballers
Expatriate footballers in Greece
Yugoslav expatriate sportspeople in Greece
Bosnia and Herzegovina football managers
FK Modriča managers
FK Kolubara managers
Bosnia and Herzegovina national under-21 football team managers
NK TOŠK Tešanj managers
NK Bratstvo Gračanica managers